Demetris Summers (born October 12, 1983) is a former Canadian football running back who played for the Calgary Stampeders of the Canadian Football League. He was released by the team in April 2010.

He was signed by the Dallas Cowboys as an undrafted free agent in 2006. He played college football at South Carolina before being expelled from the team March 1, 2005 after the coaching change and did not play anywhere in the 2005 season before entering early for the 2006 NFL draft, where he was undrafted.

Summers won the 96th Grey Cup as a member of the Stampeders.

Early years
Summers was a record setting running back at Lexington High School and was recruited as the No. 2 running back in the nation. He also was a four-year starter in basketball, his freshman year he tipped in a missed shot with 0.6 seconds left to defeat Dorman High School 46-45 in the Upper State Championship. Lexington would go on to win the state championship over Marlboro County High School. On October 10 of 2014, Summers became a new member of the Lexington Wildcat Hall of Fame.

External links
Calgary Stampeders bio
South Carolina Gamecocks bio

1983 births
Living people
People from Lexington, South Carolina
American football running backs
American players of Canadian football
Canadian football running backs
South Carolina Gamecocks football players
Dallas Cowboys players
Calgary Stampeders players